The Ananev uezd, located in modern-day Ukraine, was one of the subdivisions of the Kherson Governorate of the Russian Empire. It was situated in the southwestern part of the governorate. Its administrative centre was Ananiv (Ananyev).

Demographics
At the time of the Russian Empire Census of 1897, Ananyevsky Uyezd had a population of 265,762. Of these, 62.0% spoke Ukrainian, 13.5% Moldovan or Romanian, 11.0% Russian, 8.3% Yiddish, 3.8% German, 0.7% Polish, 0.2% Romani, 0.2% Bulgarian, 0.1% Czech, 0.1% Belarusian and 0.1% Greek as their native language.

References

 
Uezds of Kherson Governorate
Kherson Governorate